The 21st century in the United States refers to the period in the United States from 2001 through 2099 in the Gregorian calendar.  For articles on this period, see:

 History of the United States series:
 History of the United States (1991–2008)
 History of the United States (2008–present)